
The Avon River is a small river in central Nova Scotia, Canada.

A northerly flowing river, the Avon River's flow rises at an elevation of 145 metres (475 ft.) at Card and Bag Lakes on the South Mountain, a distance of approximately 29 kilometres (18 miles) southwest of the town of Windsor. At Windsor Forks the main tributary, the West Branch Avon River,  adds its flow, along with that of the Southwest Branch Avon, to the Avon. The West Branch Avon River rises at an elevation of 175 metres (574 ft.) at Black River Lake. Both the flows of the Avon and the West Branch have been impeded by hydropower developments in the early twentieth century. Near the rural community of Martock, the river enters a broad glacial river valley forming a ria where it becomes tidal, creating an estuary for its remaining route to the Minas Basin at Kempt Shore, several kilometres downriver from the town of Hantsport. Another tributary, the St. Croix River joins just below Windsor creating a total watershed of 1,306 square kilometres.

Rivers flowing into the Avon include the Halfway, Herbert, Cogmagun, Kennetcook and St. Croix.

The Avon River is evident on many very early maps of the region and by 1686 is shown, along with its drainage basin, on Jean-Baptiste-Louis Franquelin's map in great detail.

Causeway and controversy

In 1970 the Avon River was completely obstructed by a rock and earth fill causeway immediately downstream from Windsor at its junction with the St. Croix River as part of the development of a controlled access expressway called Highway 101.

The Avon River Causeway replaced an existing road bridge upriver from town and also resulted in the rerouting of the Dominion Atlantic Railway's Halifax-Yarmouth main line which used to run through Windsor's downtown, crossing the river on a bridge parallel to the road bridge immediately upriver from the town.

The causeway controls the Avon River's discharge and the incoming tidal waters of the Minas Basin through a series of flood control gates which are intended to regulate the river's flowage to prevent flooding of agricultural lands upriver near Martock. The section of the Avon River upriver of the causeway along the Windsor waterfront is now a 'man-made' freshwater, Lake Pesaquid.

The construction of the causeway has dramatically affected the Avon River downstream from Windsor, with large parts of the once-navigable river now being obstructed by large mud flats and vegetation, owing to the lack of tidal exchange and freshwater discharge. The nature writer Harry Thurston has noted, "Almost before the last stone was put in place, sediment began to accumulate to an alarming rate - 5 to 14 centimetres per month. Within seven years, a four metre high island of silt formed on the seaward side of the causeway; and the effects were felt 20 kilometres downstream, where two metres of mud impaired navigation at Hantsport."

Dr. Michael Risk of the University of Guelph, researching the build-up of a new mud flat on the seaward side of the causeway, "estimated that the bottom-dwelling creatures at Windsor were experiencing a two-thirds mortality rate", which led him to state the new formation was a "biological desert". The onset of the mud flat formation left the sediments in an initial state which were too soft to support organisms. The need to monitor and assess the impacts of such changes gave impetus to a greater interest in Bay of Fundy ecosystem and the ultimate establishment of the Acadia Centre for Estuarine Research (ACER) in Wolfville.  Contrasting the initial decline of bottom-dwelling creatures, Dr. Graham Daborn of ACER found that zoo-plankton "are more abundant than previously thought. They appear to be able to thrive on non-living organic matter..." and that this "abundance of creatures at the lower end of the food chain suggests a considerable nursery role for the inner Bay."  This notion is supported by research work completed by Dr. Sherman Bleakney of Acadia University.

Recently announced plans for the expansion of Highway 101 between the Halifax Regional Municipality and the eastern end of the Annapolis Valley have raised concerns about maintaining the Avon River causeway. An environmental lobby group, Friends of the Avon River (FAR), has called upon the Federal Fisheries Ministers to instigate a Comprehensive Environmental Impact Assessment Study (CEIA) of the complete Avon River Watershed in order to protect the Endangered Atlantic Salmon, the COSWIC listed American Eel and their 'critical habitats'. The Avon River Causeway has 'zero' fish passageway. Thus, impeding all fish species needing to migrate to their freshwater habitats, in order to complete their lifecycles.  FAR reviewed and supported a report to have a more indepth study regarding the protection of fish species before the expansion of gypsum quarries within the river's watershed because of threats to river life, citing the use de-watering runoff from the quarries.

A decision in August 2007 by the New Brunswick government to remove a similar causeway (constructed in 1968) blocking the Petitcodiac River, another tributary of the Bay of Fundy, to avoid facing charges under the federal Fisheries Act, is expected to have ramifications for the Avon River causeway.

See also
List of rivers of Nova Scotia

References

Further reading
 Danika van Proosdij and Sarah M. Townsend, "Sedimentation and Mechanisms of Salt Marsh Colonization on the Windsor Mudflats", in The Changing Bay of Fundy—Beyond 400 Years, 2004
 J.A. Percy, "The ‘Cause’ in Causeway: Crossing the Avon River at Windsor", Fundy Issues #28 newsletter of the Bay of Fundy Ecosystem Partnership (BOFEP), Winter 2008.

External links
 2004 study of environmental impacts of widening the causeway
 Acadia Centre for Estuarine Research

Landforms of Hants County, Nova Scotia
Rivers of Nova Scotia